William Henry Woodhouse (16 April 1856 – 4 March 1938) was an English amateur  first-class cricketer, who played nine matches for Yorkshire County Cricket Club in 1884 and 1885.

Born in Bradford, Yorkshire, Woodhouse was a right-handed batsman, he scored 218 runs with a best score of 63 against Sussex.  He also scored 62 against Gloucestershire.  He took six catches in the field.

He died in Bradford in March 1938, aged 81.

References

External links
Cricinfo Profile

1856 births
1938 deaths
Yorkshire cricketers
Cricketers from Bradford
English cricketers
English cricketers of 1864 to 1889